The type of the dishes of the Indian state of Arunachal Pradesh vary within the region, according to tribal influence (with the influence of Apatanis, Chuki, adi and Nishi)

Apong or rice beer made from fermented rice or millet is a popular beverage in Arunachal Pradesh, as an alcoholic drink. There are different varieties of rice beer with different flavours.

The staple food is rice along with fish, meat (Lukter) and many green vegetables. Different varieties of rice are available. Lettuce is the most common and preferred vegetable of all, prepared by boiling it with ginger, coriander and green chillies and pinch of salt. Boiled rice cakes wrapped in leaves is a famous way of packing the cooked rice. Dishes in eastern districts like Tirap and Changlang have some different method in their way of food preparation.

Many wild herbs and shrubs are also part of the cuisine. Dried bamboo shoots are used extensively in cooking.Fresh bamboo shoots are very loved.

Prior to Indian Independence when British policy to isolate the Hill people NEFA (North-East Frontier Agency) were in effect, wild birds and animals were a big part of their diet, but modern restrictions on hunting has made them non-existent.

References

External links
 Indian Tourism

Culture of Arunachal Pradesh
Indian cuisine by state or union territory